Raglan railway station is a heritage-listed disused railway station located on the Main Western railway at Raglan in the Bathurst Region local government area of New South Wales, Australia. The former station was added to the New South Wales State Heritage Register on 2 April 1999.

History 

The line to Raglan, then the terminus of the line, opened for passenger traffic on 4 March 1873 and for goods traffic on 4 August. The station was originally built on the top of a steep incline. Following a severe train crash in early 1890, which could have been prevented had there been runaway points at Raglan station, there were also calls to remove the station to more level ground.

The colonial government acted quickly after the inquiry into the accident, and the new station on a site on level ground opened on 20 October 1890. The current station dates from this time.

Description 

The station building is a type 9, non-standard timber building with brackets and a tin roof.

The station has an island platform made from brick.

Heritage listing 
Raglan is an interesting site as it is non-standard and built at a time when the railway administration was radically changing and the first use of standard buildings was being introduced. It is important illustrating the change of design and policy.

Raglan railway station was listed on the New South Wales State Heritage Register on 2 April 1999 having satisfied the following criteria.

The place possesses uncommon, rare or endangered aspects of the cultural or natural history of New South Wales.

This item is assessed as historically rare. This item is assessed as arch. rare. This item is assessed as socially rare.

See also 

List of disused regional railway stations in New South Wales

References

Bibliography

Attribution

External links

New South Wales State Heritage Register
Disused regional railway stations in New South Wales
Articles incorporating text from the New South Wales State Heritage Register
Railway stations in Australia opened in 1890
Railway stations in Australia opened in 1873
Main Western railway line, New South Wales